303 were a British girl group based in London. The band consists of Chloe Wealleans-Watts, Io Munro and Maddie Hinkley. 303 are signed to independent label Hot Spring Music.

History 
303 first came together after Munro and Hinkley, both Londoners, contacted Newcastle-based Wealleans-Watts. The group was founded on 30 March 2017, which inspired the name.

Their debut single, "Whisper", was premiered on 22 November 2018 on The Fader.

Discography

Singles 
 "Whisper" (2018)
 "Whisper" (acoustic) (2019)
 "Someone else" (feat. Jamie) (2019)
 "Out Here" (2019)

Music videos 
 "Whisper"
 "Whisper" (acoustic)

References 

English girl groups
British musical trios
English pop music groups
Musical groups established in 2017
Musical groups disestablished in 2022
2017 establishments in England
2022 disestablishments in England